Katarzyna Dąbrowska (born 14 March 1984) is a Polish actress and singer. She graduated from the Aleksander Zelwerowicz State Theatre Academy.

She won Countrywide French Song Contest. She scored 3rd place in XXVIII Actors Song Review in Wrocław (2007), first place in Student Song Festival in Kraków (2007). She also got II Award of Minister of Culture and National Heritage for her role as Kate in the production "Tańce w Ballybeg" on XXV Festival of Theatre Schools.

Nowadays she is an actress in Teatr Współczesny in Warsaw.

Filmography
 1997: Klan as bank worker
 2005: Egzamin z życia as Zeta's friend
 2006: M jak miłość as Lidka
 2006: Mrok as Krycha
 2007: Kryminalni as Paulina Wysocka
 2008: Londyńczycy as waitress
 2008–present: Na dobre i na złe as Wiktoria Manuela Consalida
 2009: Teraz albo nigdy! as Inka
 2009-2010: Czas honoru as Graba, guard in jail
 2009: Zuzanna as Anna
 2011: Czarny czwartek (voice)
 2011: Urodziny
 2016: The Innocents as nun Anna

References

External links

 
Film Polski: Katarzyna Dąbrowska page

1984 births
Living people
People from Nowe Miasto Lubawskie
Polish film actresses
Polish television actresses
21st-century Polish actresses
21st-century Polish singers
21st-century Polish women singers